Gandy-Sun Bay South is a neighborhood within the city limits of Tampa, Florida. As of the 2010 census, the neighborhood had a population of 14,912. The ZIP Codes serving the area are 33611 and 33616.

Geography
Gandy-Sun Bay South boundaries are Gandy Boulevard to the north, Tampa Bay to the west, Interbay Boulevard/Everett Avenue/Tampa Bay to the south, and MacDill Avenue to the east. The neighborhood is part of the South Tampa district.

Demographics
As of the 2010 census, there were 14,912 people and 6,759 households residing in the neighborhood. The population density was 4,261/mi2. The racial makeup of the neighborhood was 76% White, 10% African American, 1% Native American, 5% Asian, 3% from other races, and 4% from two or more races. Hispanic or Latino of any race were about 17% of the population.

There were 6,759 households, out of which 22% had children under the age of 18 living with them, 33% were married couples living together, 15% had a female householder with no husband present, and 11% were non-families. 36% of all households were made up of individuals.

In the neighborhood the population was spread out, with 19% under the age of 18, 28% from 18 to 34, 23% from 35 to 49, 18% from 50 to 64, and 11% who were 65 years of age or older. For every 100 females, there were 102.8 males.

The per capita income for the neighborhood was $19,502. About 14% of the population were below the poverty line. Of those, 38% are under age 18.

Education
Thomas Richard Robinson High School
Monroe Middle School
Lanier Elementary School
Chiaramonte Elementary School
Westshore Elementary School in Port Tampa

See also
Neighborhoods in Tampa, Florida

References

External links
Gandy/Sun Bay South
Sun Bay South Civic Association
Southside Baptist Church

Neighborhoods in Tampa, Florida